Friedelite is a mineral in the pyrosmalite group. The mineral is named after Charles Friedel.

Name 
The name friedelite is only for pure Mn end-member of the group pyrosmalite. 

The mineral was named in 1876 by Emile Bertrand after Charles Friedel.

Characteristics

Color 
Its color can be pale pink, dark brownish red, red, brown, or orangish red. It is normally found in 1 to 5 carats as well as nontransparent.

Fluorescence 
The mineral has a colorful luminescense under UV light. With the fluorescence being red, but at rare times it has a green or yellow fluorescence.

References 

Minerals